The Maidstone Studios, formerly called TVS Television Centre, is the UK's largest independent television studio complex, and is based at Vinters Park in Maidstone, Kent, UK. It has been home to a varied selection of independent British television programming including Later... with Jools Holland, Jools' Annual Hootenanny, Take Me Out, Catchphrase, as well as popular children's shows such as Mister Maker and Let's Play for CBeebies.

Other recent credits also include: Bang on the Money, The Royals on E!, Ultimate Brain and Hetty Feather for CBBC, Davina McCall - Fitness DVDs, and The Coalition drama for Channel 4.

History

ITV
The site was originally chosen by the now defunct ITV company Southern Television in 1979 for a proposed new studio facility should they win the contract from the Independent Broadcasting Authority (the UK television regulator at the time), for the new dual South and South-east of England region in 1981. As Southern Television lost their franchise, they sold the site to the successful applicant Television South (TVS) at a premium. It was part of the agreement between TVS and the IBA, that TVS needed to provide a separate studio facility for the South East region.

The complex first opened in late 1982 providing broadcasting and production output for TVS. The site was also used as a regional office and a newsgathering hub, broadcasting the South East daily edition of Coast to Coast. TVS continued to use Maidstone until the end of their franchise, which they lost in 1991.

Independent ownership
When TVS lost its franchise from ITV, the Maidstone facility was retained, with a view to TVS becoming an independent production company.  The new south and south east ITV contractor, Meridian, initially continued to rent space in the building as a production centre for the south east edition of Meridian Tonight, before moving to its own centre at nearby New Hythe between 1994 and 2004. The Meridian newsgathering operation returned to Maidstone Studios in 2004, though the studio for the programme moved to Meridian's new base at Whiteley in Hampshire.

TVS, including the Maidstone Studios, was quickly bought by International Family Entertainment Inc. and the studios were used as an independent production facility. IFE subsequently launched a UK version of The Family Channel based in The Maidstone Studios, using some elements of the TVS programme archive. Flextech was a partner in the venture, taking a 39% stake in the business. In 1996, the studio complex was sold by International Family Entertainment Inc. to Flextech when it acquired the remaining 61% of the UK Family Channel business.

During 2002 the new owner of Flextech, Telewest Communications, overhauled the structure of the operations which resulted in the disposal of the studios.

The studios were bought in 2002 by a local consortium of businessmen under the name Dovedale Associates for £4.25 million, headed by ex-BBC producer Geoff Miles. In 2005 a £2 million refurbishment programme took place, as part of the new owner's plans for the complex. A new Studio 5 (now known as Studio 1) was opened, which covers  able to accommodate a 2,000-strong audience; it is now their flagship HD studio, and between April 2013 and December 2018 was the home of BBC2's Later... with Jools Holland.

From 2006 to 2012 a company called "TVS Television Productions Ltd" was based in offices at The Maidstone Studios. The name "Television South Ltd", "TVS" and the colour logo device had been re-registered to lighting cameraman Keith Jacobsen, who traded as an independent production company with no links to the original. The 'new' TVS ceased trading on 9 March 2012, but as of May 2017 is owned by another independent production company.

The area including car-parks and outbuildings to the east of the studio premises were bought by Hillreed Homes – planning permission was granted in 2014 for 77 dwellings, and work to redevelop the site started in 2017. It is planned for vehicular access to the studios (including for production trucks) to be retained through the new housing estate.

Studio facilities

As of October 2017, Maidstone Studios is only advertising its two largest studios, and is no longer advertising the three other studios on site.

Studio 1 –  – large/huge sets 
Studio 2 –  – medium/large size sets

Studios 1 and 2 have room for audience seating as well as room for sets. Studio 1 can handle 2,400 standing, 1,200 seated; Studio 2 can handle 250 seated. Both have large production galleries, are fully air-conditioned and can operate in SD or HD. Studio 1 also includes two large scene dock doors to allow easy access for people, scenery and vehicles. Access to Stage 2 is via the studio's scene dock area. The studios do not currently have any camera equipment other than a limited number of tripods and pedestals, and hence visiting productions are required to hire-in equipment from elsewhere.

Maidstone also has four edit suites, one dubbing suite, dressing rooms and green rooms, production and wardrobe departments, scenery departments, transmission and playback facilities.

On the Maidstone Studios premises is a data centre that offers rack space for servers for local, national and international companies.

Other studios on the site:
Former Studio 1 –  – small/medium size sets
Former Studio 3 –  – small sets/presenting
Former Studio 4 –  – interviewing/blue screen/continuity
The American Diner –  – filming location

Productions

1 vs. 100 – Endemol for BBC
Art Attack – TVS, later Media Merchants and STV Productions, for ITV
Bang on the Money – ITV
The Basil Brush Show – The Foundation for BBC
The Biggest Loser (2012 final) - Shine Limited for ITV
Cape Wrath – Ecosse Films for Channel 4
Catchphrase - ITV
The Coalition (2015) – Channel 4
Dale's Supermarket Sweep – TalkbackTHAMES for ITV
Defectors – Challenge
Don't Stop Believing – Shine TV/GroupM for Channel 5
The Door – ITV
Duel – ITV
FIFA eNations Cup (2019) – FIFA / Sky Sports
Finders Keepers – World Wide International Television and TVS, later STV Productions, for ITV
Fort Boyard: Ultimate Challenge – The Foundation for ITV and Disney XD (filmed on location in France)
Fraggle Rock (UK inserts) – ITV and The Jim Henson Company
Got to Dance – Sky1Guesstimation – Initial for BBCHetty Feather – CBBCI Can See Your Voice - BBC OneIt's a Mystery – Media Merchants and Meridian and ITVJeopardy! - TVS for ITVJo Brand's Great Wall of Comedy – Gold Later... with Jools Holland (2013–2018) – BBC TwoLet's Play – CBeebiesMinistry of Mayhem – ITV Productions/The Foundation for ITVThe Mint – ITVMister Maker – The Foundation for CBeebiesProve It! – STV Productions/GeronimoTV for ITVThe Royals – E!Scratch 'n' Sniff's Den of Doom (2007) - CITV
Sport Relief's Top Dog – BBC Two
Take Me Out – Talkback Thames for ITV
Trisha Goddard (2006–2010) – Townhouse TV for Channel 5
Ultimate Brain – CBBC
Was It Something I Said? – Channel 4
What's Up Doc? – TVS, later Scottish Television, for ITV
WOW! – Media Merchants and ITV Meridian and ITV

Other uses
Until 2007, Radio Caroline broadcast from the complex.
In 2010 Maidstone Studios was used for an anti-speeding TV advert, airing on ITV between 15 January and mid-February.
Some of the old office space and the  former Studio 1 have been converted into a data centre offering rack space to local, national and international businesses.
Since 2010, the University for the Creative Arts has taught television production within the office space and studio space.

References

External links

The Maidstone Studios Website
TV Ark's TVS Continuity Page (Contains promotion footage for Vinters Park's opening in 1982)
The Custodian Data Centre Website

Television studios in England
ITV offices, studios and buildings
Mass media in Kent
Buildings and structures in Maidstone